Nanguan Subdistrict  is a township-level division of Lianchi District, Baoding, Hebei, China. , it administers the following 13 residential neighborhoods:
Nanguan Avenue Community
Shizhuang Community
Jianguo Road Community
Xintai Community
Hebei Agricultural University First Community
Xinhexingdu Community
Jinxiuxincheng Community
Yufengsanqi Community
Jiahuiyuan Community
Zihengjiayuan Community
Haodaxinju Community
Xinxinwenyayuan Community
Yufeng Community

See also
List of township-level divisions of Hebei

References

Township-level divisions of Hebei
Lianchi District